Hugo McCord (1911–2004) was an American preacher and biblical scholar within the Churches of Christ in America.  He produced his own translation of the New Testament (and Genesis, Psalms, and Proverbs), titled The Everlasting Gospel, which he affectionately called the Freed-Hardeman Version.

McCord attended a number of schools: Freed–Hardeman College (now Freed–Hardeman University), the University of Illinois, the University of Tulsa, the Southern Baptist Theological Seminary, New Orleans Baptist Theological Seminary. In addition to serving as a preacher in a number of congregations, he taught at Oklahoma Christian College (now Oklahoma Christian University).

Among his many converts he baptized American church historian Earl Irvin West in 1935.

See also

 List of people from Oklahoma City
 List of people from Mississippi
 List of people from Washington (state)
 List of translators into English
 List of University of Tulsa people

References

1911 births
2004 deaths
20th-century American writers
20th-century American translators
21st-century American writers
21st-century Protestant religious leaders

21st-century translators
Freed–Hardeman University alumni
American members of the Churches of Christ
Ministers of the Churches of Christ
New Orleans Baptist Theological Seminary alumni
Oklahoma Christian University faculty
Clergy from Oklahoma City
People from Union County, Mississippi
Writers from Vancouver, Washington
Southern Baptist Theological Seminary alumni
Translators of the Bible into English
University of Illinois alumni
University of Tulsa alumni
Writers from Mississippi
Writers from Oklahoma City
20th-century American clergy
21st-century American clergy